HarbourVest Global Private Equity is an investment fund focused on investing in private equity opportunities. Established in December 2007, the company is a constituent of the FTSE 250 Index. The fund is managed by HarbourVest Partners and its chairman is Ed Warner, OBE.

References

External links 
 Official site

Financial services companies established in 2007
Investment management companies of the United Kingdom
Companies listed on the London Stock Exchange